The Camel Trail is a permissive cycleway in Cornwall, England, United Kingdom, that provides a recreational route for walkers, runners, cyclists and horse riders.

The trail is managed and maintained by Cornwall Council.

Background history
The trail follows the paths of two former rail lines: a section of the North Cornwall Railway between Padstow and Wadebridge and most of the Bodmin and Wadebridge Railway from Wadebridge to Wenford Bridge, along with a short branch from that line to Bodmin. The Bodmin and Wadebridge Railway was originally built at a cost of £35,000 following a study commissioned in 1831 by local landowner Sir William Molesworth of Pencarrow. The line was intended to carry sand from the Camel estuary to inland farms for use as fertiliser. In the 1840s, England's railway network expanded towards Bodmin. The London and South Western Railway purchased the Bodmin and Wadebridge Railway in 1846 and intended to connect it to the rest of the system by a new line through North Cornwall. The line from Halwill reached Wadebridge in June 1895 and then Padstow in March 1899.

Later the railway was used to ship slate and china clay from inland quarries to ships in Padstow and also transport fish landed in Padstow inland to London and other cities.  When both quarrying and fishing died off, the railway lost most of its traffic. The last passenger train was in 1967, freight finally ceased in 1983, when a need to invest in new track forced closure of the line.

Current trail 

The railway was built so that the trains would not have any steep inclines or sharp turns. It is these characteristics which make it suitable as a cycle trail. The first bike hire in Cornwall was set up here in 1983. The trail is now owned by Cornwall Council who bought it for £1 and the bike hire shops operating along it pay an annual fee to help with its maintenance. Only a small part of the trail, through Wadebridge, is on roads and shared with normal traffic.

Car parking at Padstow, Wadebridge and Poley's Bridge allow the trail to be broken into  sections for shorter rides.

There were efforts in the 1990s to convert the northern part of the cycleway back into a railway, part of the Bodmin and Wenford Railway a heritage line, to carry china clay traffic again. This was rejected on the grounds that the cycleway provides more benefits to the local community than removing heavy lorries from the local narrow winding roads, many of which have had to be converted to one-way operation in order to allow them to carry the lorry traffic.

In 2006 two extensions to the trail were completed. The first was from Scarlett’s Well car park in Bodmin up into the town. The second was from Poley's Bridge near St Breward to Wenfordbridge through the old clay dries, which was made possible by Imerys donating the land.

See also

Disused railway stations (Bodmin to Wadebridge line)
Rail Trail
List of rail trails
Tarka Trail

References

External links

 The Camel Trail
 Sustrans – Camel trail
 Bodmin and Wenford Railway
 Camel Trail Map

Cycleways in Cornwall
Rail trails in England
Long-distance footpaths in England
Railway lines opened in 1831
Railway lines closed in 1983
Footpaths in Cornwall